Fehntjer Tief is a river in East Frisia, Lower Saxony, Germany. It discharges into the Ems through the  near Emden.

See also
List of rivers of Lower Saxony

Rivers of Lower Saxony
Rivers of Germany